Tim Mitchell (born April 2, 1943) is an American former professional stock car racing driver. He had competed in the ARCA Menards Series from 1997 to 2011, with a majority of his starts being with Wayne Peterson Racing.

Racing career
After competing in various dirt track events across Tennessee, Mitchell would make his ARCA Bondo/Mar-Hyde Series debut in 1997, driving for Wayne Peterson Racing in the No. 06 Pontiac, running in four races with a best finish of 27th at Michigan International Speedway. For 1998, he would run three races; one race with Drew White, and the other two for Peterson. In 1999, he would remain with Peterson for two races with a best finish of 27th at Pocono Raceway, and would run three more races with him the following year.

For 2001, Mitchell would run 16 of the 25 races on the schedule driving various Peterson entries. It was also during this season that he would earn a career best finish of 11th at Toledo Speedway. Eight more top-20's over the course of the season would help propel him to a career best 15th in the overall standings for that season. He would run a near-full schedule in 2002, failing to qualify for five events, and racing in 15 events, including a one race deal with Norm Benning in the No. 8 Chevrolet at Salem Speedway. In 2003, he would start out the year with Peterson, before attempting two races with Benning, failing to qualify at Salem, and finishing 40th at Nashville Superspeedway.

In 2004, Mitchell would run the full schedule for Peterson in the No. 0 Chevrolet, failing to qualify three times, and only finishing three races with a best finish of 22nd at the season finale at Talladega Superspeedway. He would attempt the full schedule again in 2005, running in 20 races whilst failing to qualify for three, with a best finish of 15th at Pocono. In 2006, Mitchell would primarily drive the No. 06 entry for Peterson, once again attempting the full schedule, although he would fail to qualify twelve times that year (including the second Kentucky race and Gateway where he would fill in the No. 06 for that race). He would race thirteen times that year with a best result of 19th at Berlin Raceway.

Mitchell would once again attempt the full schedule in 2007, primarily driving a Ford, failing to qualify five times and earning a best result of 14th at Winchester Speedway. He would run his last full schedule in 2008, solely driving the No. 06 entry for Peterson, failing to qualify three times that year while getting a season best finish of 19th at Talladega, which would be the last ARCA race he would be running at the end.

After spending two years out of the series, Mitchell would return to the now ARCA Racing Series at Talladega, reuniting with Wayne Peterson to drive the No. 0 Ford. He would finish 39th and last after running only three laps due to a clutch issue. He would run two more races later that year with Fast Track Racing in the No. 10 Dodge, finishing 31st at Salem, and 37th at Kansas Speedway. These would be his last two starts in ARCA competition.

Personal life
In 2003, Mitchell was diagnosed with colon cancer, and underwent treatment and surgery. He was able to make a full recovery, although he would have to wear a colostomy bag due to his rectum being removed during the operation.

According to Mitchell's Facebook page, he is the owner of a skate center named Starwheels Skate Center in his hometown of Fayetteville, Tennessee, and had sponsored him through the latter stages of his racing career.

Motorsports results

ARCA Racing Series
(key) (Bold – Pole position awarded by qualifying time. Italics – Pole position earned by points standings or practice time. * – Most laps led.)

References

1943 births
Living people
NASCAR drivers
ARCA Menards Series drivers
Racing drivers from Tennessee
People from Fayetteville, Tennessee